Erm Lund (7 February 1914 – 22 January 2003) was an Estonian weightlifter. Lund began training at the Tallinn Workers' Sports Association under the guidance of Arnold Luhaäär. He competed in the men's featherweight event at the 1936 Summer Olympics.

References

1914 births
2003 deaths
Estonian male weightlifters
Olympic weightlifters of Estonia
Weightlifters at the 1936 Summer Olympics
Sportspeople from Tallinn
Burials at Metsakalmistu